Talk to Myself may refer to:

"Talk to Myself" single from Adventures in Paradise (Christopher Williams album) (1989)
"Talk to Myself", song from Stories (Avicii album)
"Talk to Myself", song Thug on da Line